The 2018 U23 World Wrestling Championships were the second edition of U23 World Wrestling Championships of combined events, held from November 12 to 18 in Bucharest, Romania.

Medal table

Team ranking

Medal summary

Men's freestyle

Men's Greco-Roman

Women's freestyle

References

External links 
 Official website
 Schedule

 
World Wrestling U23 Championships
World Wrestling U23 Championships
International wrestling competitions hosted by Romania
Sports competitions in Bucharest
World U23 Wrestling Championship
World U23 Wrestling Championships